Reddelich is a municipality  in the Rostock district, in Mecklenburg-Vorpommern, Germany.

During the 2007 G8 summit in Heiligendamm, one of the protest camps was situated immediately to the south-west of Reddelich, with about 5000 anti-globalisation protesters staying there.

References

Rostock (district)
Municipalities in Mecklenburg-Western Pomerania